Moldova competed at the 2012 Summer Paralympics in London, United Kingdom from August 29 to September 9, 2012.

Powerlifting 

Men

Women

See also

 Moldova at the 2012 Summer Olympics

References

Nations at the 2012 Summer Paralympics
2012
2012 in Moldovan sport